Seray Kaya (born 4 February 1991) is a Turkish actress known for playing Lena Hatun in historical series Kuruluş: Osman.

Early life
Seray Kaya was born on 4 February 1991 in Istanbul, Turkey. During her high school years she pursued her education as a make-up artist, after her high school education, she was enrolled in Sadri Alışık Culture Centre where she received adequate training for acting.

Career
Kaya began her acting career in 2012, she appeared in the series Huzur Sokağı and portrayed the character of Rezzan. In 2014, she appeared in the series Kocamın Ailesi and portrayed the character of Miray. In 2016, she had a leading role in the series Gülümse Yeter and depicted the character of Gül, it starred Erdal Özyağcılar, Aslı Bekiroğlu, Evrim Doğan and others. In 2017, she had a leading role in the series Kadın and depicted the character of Şirin Sarıkadı. Kaya has stated she received a lot of criticism and hatred on social media, due to portraying a negative character in the series. In 2019, she made her cinematic debut in the movie Türkler Geliyor: Adaletin Kılıcı and depicted the character of Maria. In 2020, she appeared in the historical fiction series Kuruluş: Osman and portrayed the character of Lena Hatun. In 2021, Kaya starred in the series Mahkum, the show was adaptation of South Korean show Innocent Defendant. She portrayed the character of Cemre, it starred Onur Tuna and İsmail Hacıoğlu as main characters. In 2022, with the series still being on-air, Kaya left the series.

Personal life
Seray Kaya's father Hasan Kaya died on 3 February 2019 due to heart attack, a day before her 28th birthday. She announced the death of her father through Instagram. On 4 February 2020, in addition to celebrating her 29th birthday, she released a song called Baba, in tribute to his death.

Filmography

References

External links

Living people
1991 births
Turkish television actresses
21st-century Turkish actresses
Turkish film actresses
Actresses from Istanbul